The VR Class Sk3, originally known as the Finnish Steam Locomotive Classes G3, G5, G10 & G11, was a class of 88 2-6-0 steam locomotives, built for the Finnish State Railways from 1892 to 1903 at Tampella. One is preserved (No. 400), at the Finnish Railway Museum

External links
Finnish Railway Museum
Steam Locomotives in Finland Including the Finnish Railway Museum

Gallery

References

Sk3
Sk3
Railway locomotives introduced in 1903
Tampella locomotives
2-6-0 locomotives